Gandak Hydro Power Station is a hydro-electric plant located in Pratappur, Nawalparasi district of Nepal.  The flow from Narayani River is used to generate 15 MW electricity and annual energy is 106.38 GWh. The plant is a part of irrigation facility in the Gandak River constructed as a part of India-Nepal Gandak River Agreement. A barrage in the Narayani river diverts the flow to India and Nepal for irrigation viz. the eastern canal (24.1 m3/s) and western canal (8.5 m3/s). This power station is located on the western canal approximately 18 km downstream of barrage at Surajpura, Nepal.

See also

List of power stations in Nepal

References

Hydroelectric power stations in Nepal
Buildings and structures in Parasi District